Alicia Caro (born 1930) is a Colombian retired film actress. She settled in Mexico where she appeared in films during the Golden Age of Mexican cinema.

Selected filmography
 Girls in Uniform (1951)
 Daughter of Deceit (1951)
 Snow White (1952)
 Chucho the Mended (1952)
 The White Rose (1954)
 The Three Elenas (1954)

References

Bibliography 
 Charles Ramírez Berg. The Classical Mexican Cinema: The Poetics of the Exceptional Golden Age Films. University of Texas Press, 2015.

External links 
 

1930 births
Living people
Colombian film actresses
People from Bogotá
Colombian emigrants to Mexico